Arnold J. Kemp is an American artist who works in painting, print, sculpture, and poetry. Kemp received a BA/BFA from Tufts University and the School of the Museum of Fine Arts Boston, and an MFA from Stanford University.

From 1991 to 2005, Kemp lived and worked in San Francisco, CA, where he showed works independently and was a curator at Yerba Buena Center for the Arts. More recently, he was chair of the MFA in Visual Studies at Pacific Northwest College of Art PNCA in Portland, Oregon. He  also served as Painting and Printmaking Chair & Associate Professor at the School of the Arts, Virginia Commonwealth University. Currently he is Dean of Graduate studies at School of the Art Institute of Chicago and Professor of Painting and Drawing.

Work
In 2001, he first showed work in New York at the Studio Museum's Freestyle Exhibition. The "Freestyle" exhibition was discussed in the context of the post-black art movement, a moment where black artists confronted and abandoned the label of being 'black' artists. In 2022 Kemp exhibited new work at both M. LeBlanc Gallery and the Neubauer Collegium in Chicago, IL. For both exhibitions the work continued the themes of masking and the use of aluminum foil. 

Significant works of Kemp's are in the collections of the Metropolitan Museum of Art, The Studio Museum in Harlem, The Berkeley Art Museum, The Portland Art Museum, The Tacoma Art Museum, the Fine Arts Collection at the University of California, Davis, and the Frances Lehman Loeb Art Center at Vassar College.

In 2012, Kemp was awarded a Fellowship from the John Simon Guggenheim Memorial Foundation. Kemp has also received awards from the Joan Mitchell Foundation, the Pollock-Krasner Foundation, Artadia, Art Matters, and Printed Matter, Inc.

Content of Artwork

Over the last decade, no material has been as powerfully symbolic for Kemp as aluminum foil. This domestic, yet industrial substance—reflective, yet burnished, crinkly, and endlessly impressionable—has become the artist’s truest metaphor for the psyche. Many of the objects that Kemp has created with foil have taken the form of “masks”—expanses of fractalized sheet foil with strangely shaped holes that resemble eyes and mouths. Their depths appear to collapse time and space, imbuing the works with an indescribable sense of traumatic duration. In the masks, Kemp also uses foil as a foil, to deflect menace, to fool and outsmart violence and predatory behavior, and to protect what is most critical, vulnerable, and precious: art, queer love, blackness, rage, justice … At times Kemp reproduces the foils as color photographs. In this form, they fill their frames such that the only edges we see become dark orifices, signaling that we are in the presence of an object with an unspecified relation to a body, or disembodied spirit. Kemp has produced these images in varying sizes; some as tall as dressing mirrors. At this size, the foil’s patterns become a field of refraction ruptured by the dark, worrying pools.

Exhibitions
 KSMOCA, Portland, OR 2019
 Fourteen 30 Contemporary, Portland, OR 2018
 May 68/Martos Gallery, New York, NY, 2018
 Biquini Wax, Mexico City, Mexico 2017
 Iceberg Projects, Chicago, IL 2017
 Cherry & Lucic, Portland, OR 2016
 Soloway, Brooklyn, NY 2015
 PDX Contemporary, Portland, OR (2009 & 2010)
 Patricia Sweetow Gallery, San Francisco (2009)
 Envoy, New York (2008)
 TBA Festival/ Portland Institute of Contemporary Art, Portland, Oregon (2007)
 Stephen Wirtz Gallery, San Francisco (2006)
 Quotidian Gallery, San Francisco (2002)
 Debs & Co., New York (2001)
 ESP, San Francisco (1998)

Further reading
 Kemp, Arnold J. 2007. "Trueblack". Art Journal. 66 (1): 59.
 1990. "Crocodilopilos". Callaloo. 13 (3): 381-383. 
 1990. "Elegy: For Paul Coppola (1966-1988)". Callaloo. 13 (3): 386. 
 1990. "Marketplaces". Callaloo. 13 (3): 384-385. 
 1993. "Assumptions in Flight". Callaloo. 16 (2): 306-308. 
 1993. "Like Sabines". Agni. (37): 48-50.
 Golden, Thelma, and Hamza Walker. 2001. Freestyle. New York, NY: Studio Museum in Harlem.

References

 https://art.newcity.com/2017/08/31/art-50-2017-chicagos-visual-vanguard/4/

External links
 Art 21 article
 Interview with Kemp

Year of birth missing (living people)
Living people
African-American artists
Artists from San Francisco
Pacific Northwest College of Art faculty
Place of birth missing (living people)
Stanford University alumni
Tufts University alumni
21st-century African-American people